Mount Berlin is a  high glacier-covered volcano in Marie Byrd Land, Antarctica,  from the Amundsen Sea. Trachyte is the dominant volcanic rock and occurs in the form of lava flows and pyroclastic rocks. It is part of the Marie Byrd Land Volcanic Province.

The volcano began erupting during the Pliocene and was active into the late Pleistocene-Holocene. Several tephra layers encountered in ice cores all over Antarctica - but in particular at Mount Moulton - have been linked to Mount Berlin, which is the most important source of such tephras in the region. The tephra layers were formed by explosive eruptions/Plinian eruptions that generated high eruption columns. Presently, fumarolic activity occurs at Mount Berlin and forms ice towers from freezing steam.

Geography and geomorphology 

The volcano was studied during field trips in December 1940, November 1967, November-December 1977 and 19941995. The volcano is named after Leonard M. Berlin, who led the 1940 research visit to the mountain.

These craters are aligned in east-west direction like other Flood Range calderas. The volcano is the western end of the Flood Range; Wells Saddle separates it from Mount Moulton volcano farther east.

The volcano is covered by glaciers, and thus only a few rocky outcrops occur on the mountain although the volcano is considered to be well-exposed compared to other volcanoes in the region. Monogenetic volcanoes on the northern flank of Mount Berlin have generated two outcrops of mafic lava and scoria, one of which is found at Mefford Knoll on a linear vent. On the southeastern flank, a fiamme-rich ignimbrite crops out and is correlated to a flank vent on the northeastern flank. A ridge emanates northwestward from Merrem Peak, with Brandenberger Bluff at its foot. Other topographical locations on Mount Berlin are Fields Peak on the northern flank, Kraut Rocks at the west-southwestern foot, Walts Cliff on the northeastern flank and Wedemeyer Rocks at the southern foot. The existence of tuyas has been reported from Mount Berlin. According to a 1972 report, tephra overlies ice at some sites. Nonvolcanic features include incipient cirques on the northern and western side.

Geology 

The Marie Byrd Land volcanic province features 18 central volcanoes and accompanying parasitic vents, which form islands off the coast or nunataks in the ice. Such a movement is also apparent in the Flood Range, where activity migrated from Mount Moulton to Mount Berlin. This movement appears to reflect the propagation of crustal fractures, as plate motion is extremely slow in the region. Volcanic activity appears to take place in three phases, an early mafic phase, often followed by a second felsic phase. End-stage volcanism occurs in the form of small cone-forming eruptions. Ignimbrites are rare in Marie Byrd Land; the outcrop on the southeastern flank of Mount Berlin is a rare exception. 

Activity began during the middle Miocene and continued into the later Quaternary, with argon-argon dating yielding ages as young as 8,200 years. Four volcanoes in the Marie Byrd Land volcanic province - Mount Berlin, Mount Siple, Mount Takahe and Mount Waesche - were classified as "possibly or potentially active" by LeMasurier 1990, and active subglacial volcanoes have been identified on the basis of aerophysical surveys. 

The volcanic province is related to the West Antarctic Rift which is variously interpreted as a rift or as a plate boundary. The rift has been volcanically and tectonically active over the past 30-25 million years. The basement crops out near the coast and consists of Paleozoic rocks with intruded Cretaceous and Devonian granites which were flattened by erosion, leaving a Cretaceous erosion surface on which volcanoes rest. The volcanic activity at Mount Berlin may ultimately relate to the presence of a mantle plume that is impinging onto the crust in Marie Byrd Land.

Local deposits 

Merrem Peak crater also has outcrops of fallout deposits. They were formed by pyroclastic fallout during eruptions, which mantled the topography and generated diverse fallout deposits when eruption characteristics changed. Tuff deposits containing lapilli and volcanic ash-rich pyroclastic deposits in the crater rim were erupted during hydromagmatic events.

Some lava flows feature levees. Some fall deposits in the crater rim were confused with lava flows in the past. Hyalotuff, obsidian and pumice have been recovered from Mount Berlin. Both welded and unwelded, pyroclastic and tuffaceous breccias are present. They consist of lava bombs, lithic rocks, obsidian fragments and pumice. Hyaloclastite occurs around the base of Mount Berlin.

Composition 

Most volcanic rocks of Mount Berlin define a trachyte suite, which features both comendite and pantellerite. Phonolite is less common. Mafic rocks have been reported from flank vents, basanite and hawaiite from Mefford Knoll, benmoreite from the southeastern flank at Wedemeyer Rocks, phonotephrite from Brandenberger Bluff and mugearite without any particular locality. 

Phenocrysts make up only a small portion of the volume and consist mostly of alkali feldspar, with subordinate apatite, fayalite, hedenbergite and opaque minerals. Benmoreite has more phenocrysts, which include anorthoclase, magnetite, olivine, plagioclase, pyroxene and titanaugite. Groundmass include basanite, mafic rocks, trachyte and trachy-phonolite. Xenoliths are also recorded. 

The magma erupted by Mount Berlin appears to originate in the form of discrete small batches rather than in one large magma chamber. The composition of volcanic rocks varied between eruptions and probably also during different phases of the same eruption. Phonolite was erupted early during volcanic evolution and followed by trachyte during the Quaternary. A long term trend in iron and sulfur of the tephras may indicate a long term trend towards more primitive magma compositions.

Eruption history 

Mount Berlin was active from the Pliocene into the Holocene. The oldest parts are found at Wedemeyer Rocks and Brandenberger Bluff and are 2.7 million years old. Activity then took place at Merrem Peak between 571,000 and 141,000 years ago; during this phase eruptions also occurred on the flanks of Mount Berlin. Over time, volcanic activity on Mount Berlin has moved in south-southeast direction. 

Such intense eruptions would have injected tephra into the stratosphere and deposited it across the southern Pacific Ocean and the West Antarctic Ice Sheet. The patterns of tephra deposition indicate that westerly winds transported tephra from Mount Berlin over Antarctica. During the last 100,000 years Mount Berlin has been more active than Mount Takahe, the other major source of tephra in the West Antarctic, but activity at Berlin was episodic rather than steady. The volcano underwent a surge in activity between 35,000/40,000 - 18,000/20,000 years ago. Despite their size, the eruptions at Mount Berlin did not significantly impact climate.

A number of tephra layers found in ice cores all across Antarctica have been attributed to West Antarctic volcanoes and in particular to Mount Berlin. Tephras deposited by this volcano have been used to date ice cores, establishing that ice at Mount Moulton is at least 492,000 years old and thus the oldest ice of West Antarctica. So-called "megadust" layers in ice cores have also been linked to Mount Berlin and other volcanoes in Antarctica.

Chronology 

Among eruptions recorded at Mount Berlin are:
 Tephras in the Vostok ice cores deposited 406,000 years ago may come from Mount Berlin.
 492,400±9,700 years ago, recorded at Mount Moulton. It may correspond to a 443,000±52,000 lava at Merrem Peak.
 Cinder cones at Mefford Knoll have been dated to be 211,000±18,000 years old. Potassium-argon dating there and at Kraut Rocks has produced ages of 630,000±30,000 and 620,000±50,000 years, respectively.
 141,600±7,500 years ago, recorded at Mount Moulton. It may correspond to a 141,400±5,400 deposit at Merrem Peak. A 141,700 years old tephra layer at Vostok has been related to this Mount Moulton tephra.
 The Marine Tephra B, which has been identified in marine sediment cores and the Dome Fuji ice core, was erupted by Mount Berlin 130,700±1,800 years ago. It is used as a stratigraphic marker for the transition between marine isotope stage 6 and 5.
 118,700±2,500 years ago, recorded at Mount Moulton and potentially also at Talos Dome. Correlated deposits at Siple Ice Dome indicate that this eruption was intense and deposited tephra over large areas.
 106,300±2,400 years ago, recorded at Mount Moulton.
 92,500±2,000 and 92,200±900 years ago, as dated by argon-argon dating of its deposits around Mount Berlin. A tephra layer in Dome C and Dome Fuji ice cores recovered during European Project for Ice Coring in Antarctica and dated to be 89,000-87,000 years old has been attributed to this eruption on the basis of its composition. The nature of the trachytic tephra layer indicates that it was produced during an intense, multiphase eruption which may have led to compositional differences between deposits emplaced close and these emplaced far from the volcano. Deposits from this eruption have also been found in the Amundsen Sea, the Bellingshausen Sea, at a Vostok ice core and in marine sediments of the continental margin of West Antarctica ("tephra A").
 A 28,500 year old tephra layer at Mount Erebus and in two ice cores of the West Antarctic Ice Sheet.
 27,300±2,300 years ago, recorded at Mount Moulton.
 Ages of 25,500±2,000 years ago have been obtained from two lower welded pyroclastic units that crop out within Mount Berlin crater.
 Unwelded obsidian fallout units that crop out in Mount Berlin crater have been dated to be 18,200±5,800 years old.
 14,500±3,800 years ago, recorded at Mount Moulton.
 Tephra layers found both close to and away from Mount Berlin and a lava flow appear to have been produced during an extended eruption about 10,500±2,500 years ago.
 7,768 BCE with an interval of 15 years, as dated in the Siple Dome A ice core. A lava flow on Mount Berlin and tephras at Mount Moulton have a similar composition even if no exact match is found.

A number of tephra layers between 18,100 and 55,400 years old, found in Siple Dome ice cores, resemble these of Mount Berlin, as do tephras emplaced 9,346 and 2,067 BCE (interval 3.0 years) in the Siple Dome A ice core. The marine "Tephra B" and "Tephra C" layers may also come from Mount Berlin but statistical methods have not supported such a relationship at least for "Tephra B". A 694±7 before present tephra layer found in the TALDICE ice core in East Antarctica may come from Mount Berlin or from Mount Melbourne and may have been erupted at the same time as an eruption of The Pleiades.

Last eruption and present-day activity 

The date of the last eruption of Mount Berlin is unclear but the Global Volcanism Program gives 8,350±5,300 years as the date of the last eruption. Because of its Holocene activity, the volcano is considered active and several volcano tectonic earthquakes have been recorded on Mount Berlin.  

Mount Berlin is geothermally active, the only volcano in Marie Byrd Land with such activity. Steaming ice towers are found at Mount Berlin on the western and northern rim of Berlin Crater. Their existence was first reported in 1968; ice towers form when fumarole exhalations freeze in the cold Antarctic atmosphere and are a characteristic trait of Antarctic volcanoes. ASTER satellite imaging has not detected these fumaroles presumably because they are hidden within the ice towers. These geothermal environments may host geothermal habitats similar to these in Victoria Land and at Deception Island, but Mount Berlin is remote and has never been studied in this sense. It has been prospected for the potential to obtain geothermal power.

See also
 Berlin Crevasse Field
 List of volcanoes in Antarctica

Notes

References

Sources 

 
 
 
 
 
 
 
 
 
 
 
 
 
 
 
 
 
 
 
 
 
 
 
 
 
 
 
 
 
 
 
 
 

Flood Range
Polygenetic shield volcanoes
Calderas of Antarctica
Volcanoes of Marie Byrd Land
Pliocene shield volcanoes
Pleistocene shield volcanoes
Holocene shield volcanoes